"Not Waving but Drowning" is a poem by the British poet Stevie Smith. It was published in 1957, as part of a collection of the same title. The most famous of Smith's poems, it gives an account of a drowned man, whose distressed thrashing in the water had been mistaken for waving. The poem was accompanied by one of Smith's drawings, as was common in her work.

The poem's personal significance has been the topic of several pieces of literary criticism, because Smith was treated for psychological problems. She contemplated suicide at the age of eight, after what she described as a difficult childhood and her struggle with the fact that her father abandoned her.<ref name=Walsh>Walsh, Jessica. "Stevie Smith: Girl Interrupted"Papers on Language and Literature" Vol.40.</ref>

Interpretations
Like many of Smith's poems, "Not Waving but Drowning" is short, consisting of only twelve lines. The narrative takes place from a third-person perspective, and describes the circumstances surrounding the "dead man" described in line one. In line five, the poem suggests that the man who has died "always loved larking," which causes his distress signals to be discounted.

The image that Smith attached to the poem shows the form of a girl from the waist up, with her wet hair hanging over her face. Although the image goes with a poem about a man drowning, the girl's expression appears incongruous with the text of the poem, as it forms what Smith scholar Laura Severin describes as a "mysterious smile". Jannice Thaddeus suggests that the speaker of the poem, like other figures in Smith's works, changes from male to female as part of a theme of androgyny that exists in many of the poems found in Selected Poems. Severin suggests that the figure might be Mary, a character in another poem by Smith titled "Cool as a Cucumber". The drawing was used as the accompanying image for the poem "The Frozen Lake" in Selected Poems, a self-edited compilation of Smith's works published in 1962.Smith, Stevie. Collected PoemsNew Directions Publishing (1983) pp 393-396.

Although Ingrid Hotz-Davies suggests that the "drowning man" is Smith herself, she also states that there are problems with reading the poem as a cry for help, due to the humorous tone of the poem, yet at the same time she also notes that the representational form of the poem "may easily be misread as a friendly wave of the hand". The poem's simple diction led Clive James to suggest that Smith attempted to write the poem so that the diction appeared ignorant of poetic convention, yet was carefully crafted to appear more simple than it was. James describes the relationship between Smith and the speaker in "Not Waving but Drowning" by saying, "her poems, if they were pills to cure Melancholy, did not work for [Smith]. The best of them, however, worked like charms for everyone else."

In other media

The poem was performed as part of the 1976 album Tears of Steel & the Clowning Calaveras released by Australian singer Jeannie Lewis (Track 4b), and recited by two actors: Lex Marinos as the "Narrator" (...but still he lay moaning), and Nick Lathouris as the "Dead Man" (I was too far out...)

Australian ambient and alternative music group Not Drowning, Waving take their name from the poem.

A track on Julian Cope's 1991 album Peggy Suicide was titled "Not Raving but Drowning" after the poem.

The poem was set to music by singer-songwriter Vic Chesnutt on his debut album Little, with a spoken introduction from a Stevie Smith recording.

Tanita Tikaram set the poem to music as the b-side to her single "I Might Be Crying".

Erin McKean wrote a short story entitled "Not Waving But Drowning" which was published in Machine of Death, a collection of short stories. In it she talks of the poem and the author.

Composer Nina C. Young set the poem in a piece scored for solo viola, piano, and mixed choir.

English experimental post-punk band This Heat paraphrase the title and theme of the poem in their song "Not Waving", from their 1979 eponymous debut album.

British confessional rapper Loyle Carner used the poem's title for his sophomore album of the same name. The title track features Stevie Smith commenting on the poem over piano chords composed by Jordan Rakei.

Scottish rock band Big Country recorded the song "Not Waving But Drowning" as part of the sessions for the Peace In Our Time album. The track would ultimately end up as a bonus track on the single "King Of Emotion".

In the first episode of the 2020 Netflix series The Queen’s Gambit, the poem is taught and recited in an English class, while chess prodigy Beth Harmon furtively studies a book of chess openings.

The final track of the Welsh art punk band The Victorian English Gentlemens Club's album Bag of Meat'' is titled "Not Waving But Drowning". Alongside the title, the track's lyrics seem to loosely reference and paraphrase parts of the poem.

References

External links
Stevie Smith reading "Not Waving But Drowning" (includes poem text)
British poems
1957 poems